Koch-Goma, also Koch Goma, is a human settlement in Nwoya District, in the Northern Region of Uganda.

Location

The geographical coordinates of Koch-Goma are: 2°36'16.0"N, 32°10'25.0"E (Latitude:2.604444; Longitude:32.173611).

Overview
In July 2019, Koch-Goma was reported to be the fastest-growing settlement in Nwoya District, according to the Daily Monitor newspaper. It is a nascent urban centre which is also the headquarters of Koch-Goma sub-county.

Population
Th national census and household population survey enumerated the population of Koch-Goma at 15,000 people.

Education
The available schools in the community range from nursery schools, elementary school and secondary schools. The schools range from private, community and government schools. They include (a) Koch-Goma Central Primary School (b) Coo-Rom Primary School (c) Kalang Primary School (d) Ter-Okono Community School and (e) Koch-Goma Senior Secondary School, among others.

Energy
As of July 2019, Koch-Goma was not yet connected to Uganda's national electricity grid. Those with electric connections use private solar energy installations.

Agriculture
The soils around Koch-Goma are very fertile. Crops supported include cotton, cassava and sim sim. The sub-county is a leading supplier of sim sim in Uganda.

References

External links
Parishes In Koch-Goma Sub-county, Nwoya District, Uganda
Map of Koch-Goma Sub-county, Nwoya District, Uganda As of June 2008.

Populated places in Northern Region, Uganda
Cities in the Great Rift Valley
Nwoya District